The National Liberal Party was a liberal party in Panama. The party was an observer at Liberal International.

The party was formed in 1903 out of the Panamanian branch of the Colombian Liberal Party, shortly after Panama declared independence.

The PNL merged with Solidarity Party (Partido Solidaridad) to form the new Patriotic Union Party (Unión Patriótica) in 2009.

See also
Liberalism worldwide
List of liberal parties
Liberalism in Panama

References

Defunct political parties in Panama
Liberal parties in Panama
1903 establishments in Panama
Political parties disestablished in 2009
Political parties established in 1903